Mwaghavul (also known as Mupun and Sura) is an Afro-Asiatic language spoken in Plateau State, dominantly in Mangu L.G.A., Middle Belt Region of Nigeria.

Dialects include Mupun and Takas.

Mwaghavul has one of the most elaborate systems of logophoricity known in any language (see logophoricity).

Phonology 

Mwaghavul has 6 vowels: /a, e, i, ɨ, o, u/.

References

Further reading
 Roger Blench, Mwaghavul - English dictionary, unpublished.
 Zygmunt Frajzyngier.  1993.  A Grammar of Mupun.  Berlin:  Dietrich Reimer Verlag.

External links
 Roger Blench: Mwaghavul opening page - Mwaghavul webpage at rogerblench.info

Languages of Nigeria
West Chadic languages